Arthur Price (1892–1954) was an English footballer who played in the Football League for Leeds City, Southend United and The Wednesday.

References

1890s births
1979 deaths
English footballers
Association football forwards
English Football League players
Worksop Town F.C. players
Leeds City F.C. players
Sheffield Wednesday F.C. players
Southend United F.C. players
Scunthorpe United F.C. players